Scatopyrodes is a genus of beetles belonging to the family Cerambycidae.

List of species
 Scatopyrodes angustus (Taschenberg, 1870)
 Scatopyrodes aspericornis Haller & Delahaye, 2018
 Scatopyrodes beltii (Bates, 1869)
 Scatopyrodes iris (Bates, 1884)
 Scatopyrodes lampros (Bates, 1884)
 Scatopyrodes longiceps (White, 1853)
 Scatopyrodes moreletii (Lucas, 1851)
 Scatopyrodes samiatus Galileo & Martins, 1992
 Scatopyrodes tenuicornis (White, 1850)
 Scatopyrodes trichostethus (Bates, 1879)
 Scatopyrodes vietus Galileo & Martins, 1992

References
 Biolib
 F. Vitali  Cerambycoidea

Prioninae